= Icelandic USA =

American seafood company

- Industry: Fishery
- Founded: 1946
- Headquarters: Newport News, Virginia, USA
- Key people: Ævar Agnarsson, President/CEO
- Products: Seafood
- Website: www.icelandic.com

Icelandic USA is a Newport News, Virginia, based company, and is one of the largest seafood companies in the United States.
